The Electricity Supply Staff Association (Dublin) was a trade union in  Ireland. It merged with the Transport and General Workers' Union in 1936.

See also
 List of trade unions
 Transport and General Workers' Union
 TGWU amalgamations

References
Arthur Ivor Marsh. Concise encyclopedia of industrial relations. Gower Press, Dec 1, 1979 pg. 316

Defunct trade unions of Ireland
Transport and General Workers' Union amalgamations
Trade unions disestablished in 1936
1936 disestablishments in Ireland